Buglossoides czernjajevii is a species of flowering plant in the family Boraginaceae, native to Moldova and Ukraine. A rare plant known from only ten locations, it is found on forest edges, in glades, and on grassy slopes.

References

Boraginoideae
Flora of Moldova
Flora of Ukraine
Plants described in 1981